Abdolreza (also Romanized as ʿAbdolrez̤ā) is a village in Kushk Rural District, Abezhdan District, Andika County, Khuzestan Province, Iran. At the 2006 census, its population was 102, in 17 families.

References 

Populated places in Andika County